The Order of National Hero (erovnuli gmiris ordeni) is the highest honor awarded by the government of Georgia together with the title of National Hero. It was established in 2004.

Statute 
The Order of National Hero was established on 24 June 2004. It is conferred on individuals for an "exceptional, distinguishable heroic" service to Georgia. The award carries the monetary grant of 10,000 Georgian lari.

Recipients 
 Zhiuli Shartava – Georgian politician; posthumously, 2004.
 Zaza Damenia – Georgian army corporal; posthumously, 2004.
 John McCain – United States politician; 2010.
 Lech Kaczyński – President of Poland; posthumously, 2010.   
 Zviad Gamsakhurdia – the first President of Georgia; posthumously, 2013. 
 Merab Kostava – Georgian Soviet-era dissident; posthumously, 2013.
 Giorgi Mazniashvili – Georgian general; posthumously, 2013.   
 Grigol Peradze – Georgian churchman and scholar; posthumously, 2013.
 Ekvtime Takaishvili – Georgian historian and archaeologist; posthumously, 2013.
 Ambrosi – Catholicos-Patriarch of Georgia; posthumously, 2013.
 Mikheil Tsereteli – Georgian historian; posthumously, 2013.
 Giorgi Antsukhelidze – Georgian army sergeant; posthumously, 2013. 
 Zurab Iarajuli – Georgian Air Force officer; posthumously, 2013.
 Maro Makashvili – Georgian Red Cross nurse, the first woman to be awarded the Order; posthumously, 2015.
 Guram Gabiskiria – Mayor of Sukhumi during the separatist war in Abkhazia; posthumously, 2017.
 Zurab Chavchavadze – Soviet-era dissident; posthumously, 2018.

See also
Orders, decorations, and medals of Georgia
Order of Queen Tamara (2009)

References 

Orders, decorations, and medals of Georgia (country)

2004 establishments in Georgia (country)
Awards established in 2004
Hero (title)